Bronisław Wołkowicz (born 21 October 1973) is a Polish judoka. He competed in the men's half-middleweight event at the 1996 Summer Olympics.

Achievements

References

External links

1973 births
Living people
Polish male judoka
Place of birth missing (living people)
Olympic judoka of Poland
Judoka at the 1996 Summer Olympics